Rebel Inc. may refer to:

 Rebel Inc. (magazine), a Scottish literary magazine
 Rebel Inc. (video game), a 2018 video game